Mândra or Mîndra may refer to several places:

In Romania:

 Mândra, a commune in Brașov County
 Mândra, a village in Bârla commune, Argeș County
 Mândra, a village in Loamneș commune, Sibiu County
 Mândra, a tributary of the Argeș in Argeș County
 Mândra (Olt), a tributary of the Olt in Brașov County
 Mândra, a tributary of the Păscoaia in Vâlcea County

In Moldova:

 Mîndra, a village in Hîrjauca commune, Călărași district
 Mîndra, a village in Ratuș commune, Telenești district

See also 
 Mandra (disambiguation)